The DKW Junior was a small front wheel drive saloon manufactured by Auto Union AG. The car received a positive reaction when first exhibited, initially badged as the DKW 600, at the Frankfurt Motor Show in March 1957. The ‘Junior’ name was given to the (by now) DKW 750 in 1959 when the car went into volume production, but failed to survive an upgrade in January 1963, after which the car was known as the DKW F12.    In addition to the saloon, a pretty ‘F12 Roadster’ (cabriolet version) was produced in limited numbers.

The car was known for its two-stroke engine.   A number of European auto-makers produced two-stroke powered cars in the 1950s, but by the time the DKW Junior came along, the market was beginning to resist two-stroke powered cars as the industry increasingly standardised on four-stroke four-cylinder units which accordingly were becoming cheaper to produce.   Two-stroke-engined cars were perceived by some as rough and noisy by comparison.

In terms of its size and pricing, the DKW Junior slotted into the range just below the Auto Union 1000, which itself underwent an upgrade and a name change (from DKW to Auto Union) in 1957.   The Junior was therefore from its introduction until August 1963 the only DKW branded car.

Design 
The Auto Union 1000 had a form that closely followed that of a prototype first presented in 1938. In contrast, the smaller Junior had an uncompromisingly modern ponton, three-box design, filled out to the corners and featuring tail fins which were just beginning to appear on one or two of Europe's more fashionable designs at this time.

Despite its modern shape, the body sat on a separate chassis.

Chronology 

The DKW Junior prototype exhibited in 1957 featured a two-cylinder 660 cc two-stroke engine reminiscent of the two-stroke engine last seen in the DKW F89 Meisterklasse phased out in 1953.

The four speed manual transmission was controlled via a cable linkage using a column mounted gear lever.

In 1961 the DKW Junior retailed for 4790 Marks.   It offered more luggage space and a wider cabin than the market leading Volkswagen Beetle, and customers willing to pay an extra 160 Marks for the optional heater had the advantage in winter of a car that warmed up much more rapidly than the Volkswagen with its air-cooled power unit.

It is not clear whether the DKW Junior de Luxe, introduced in 1961, was intended to replace or to complement the original Junior which, in any case, was withdrawn in 1962. The Junior de Luxe had its cylinders bored out: total displacement was now 796 cc. Claimed power output was unchanged but the torque was marginally increased and the wheel size grew from 12 to 13 inches.

In January 1963 the Junior De Luxe was replaced by the DKW F12. Apart from the engines, the big news from the F12 involved the brakes: the F12 was the first car in this class to be equipped with front disc brakes.

In August the Junior's 796 cc engine reappeared in the DKW F11 which was in effect a reduced specification F12.

The DKW F12 roadster which appeared in 1964 extracted  from its 889 cc three-cylinder engine, and this more powerful unit became available in the F12 saloon for a few months from February 1965.

End of production 
Early in the summer of 1965 Volkswagen acquired the Auto Union business from Daimler Benz: production of the two-stroke DKWs was almost immediately terminated.   In the market place the DKWs had been facing an increasing struggle to compete with similarly sized more powerful four-stroke-engined offerings from Volkswagen and, more recently, Opel.   By the end of 1965 the plant formerly controlled by Auto Union was building Audi badged cars, with four-cylinder four-stroke engines designed, before the change of ownership, in collaboration with Mercedes Benz.

Specifications

References 

Auto Union vehicles
Junior
Compact cars
Front-wheel-drive vehicles
1960s cars
Cars introduced in 1959